North Carolina's 21st Senate district is one of 50 districts in the North Carolina Senate. It has been represented by Republican Tom McInnis since 2023.

Geography
Since 2023, the district has included all of Moore County, as well as part of Cumberland County. The district overlaps with the 42nd, 43rd, 44th, 51st, 52nd, and 78th state house districts.

District officeholders

Election results

2022

2020

2018

2016

2014

2012

2010

2008

2006

2004

2002

2000

References

North Carolina Senate districts
Moore County, North Carolina
Cumberland County, North Carolina